Leaving on a Mayday is an album by singer-songwriter Anna Ternheim.  It was released on 11 August 2008 and is Ternheim's fourth full-length LP.

Track listing
  "What Have I Done" – 3:21
  "Damaged Ones" – 3:09
  "Terrified" – 4:42
  "Let It Rain" – 4:54
  "My Heart Still Beats for You" – 4:27
  "No, I Don't Remember" – 3:53
  "Make It On My Own" – 3:24
  "Summer Rain" – 3:55
  "Losing You" – 3:38
  "Off the Road" – 3:54
  "Black Sunday Afternoon" – 4:37
  "Terrified" – 3:33

Delux Edition 
CD1
 What Have I Done 
 Damaged Ones 
 Terrified 
 Let It Rain 
 My Heart Still Beats For You 
 No I Don't Remember 
 Summer Rain 
 Losing You 
 Off The Road 
 Black Sunday Afternoon 
CD2: "Anna Sings Sinatra"
 New York New York 
 Come Fly With Me 
 Fly Me To The Moon 
 That's Life 
 Strangers In The Night
Box edition
CD1
 What Have I Done 
 Damaged Ones 
 Terrified 
 Let It Rain 
 My Heart Still Beats For You 
 No I Don't Remember 
 Summer Rain 
 Losing You 
 Off The Road 
 Black Sunday Afternoon 
 New York New York 
 Come Fly With Me 
 Fly Me To The Moon 
 That's Life 
 Strangers In The Night

CD2: LIVE EP FROM TOURING 2009
 No, I Don't Remember 
 Damaged Ones 
 A French Love 
 Wedding Song 
 Let It Rain

DVD: ANNA PERFORMS FIVE ACOUSTIC VERSIONS
 What Have I Done
 Summer Rain
 No, I Don't Remember
 Off The Road
 My Heart Still Beats For You

References

External links
Verve Music Group: Anna Ternheim - Leaving on a Mayday

2008 albums
Albums produced by Björn Yttling
Anna Ternheim albums